Nuzo Onoh (born 22 September 1962) is a British-Nigerian writer. She grew up the third of the eight children of the late Chief Mrs Caroline Onoh, a former headteacher. She experienced the Biafran war with Nigeria (1967–70) as a child refugee and at the age of 13, she was the victim of an attempted "exorcism" by a local pastor. Due to this experience, she currently advocates for greater awareness of ritual child abuse in African communities.

Education
Nuzo Onoh attended Queen's School, in Enugu Nigeria, as well as The Mount School, York, a Quaker boarding school in York, and later, St Andrew's Tutorial College, Cambridge, England.  Onoh holds a law degree and a master's degree in writing from Warwick University.

Writing
She is a pioneer of the African horror subgenre. Onoh's books The Reluctant Dead (2014) and Unhallowed Graves (2015) are both collections of ghost stories depicting core Igbo culture, traditions, beliefs and superstitions within a horror context.
She is also author of The Sleepless (2016) and Dead Corpse (2017). Onoh's works have featured in numerous magazines and, to date, she is the only African horror fiction writer to have featured on Starburst, the world's longest-running magazine of cult entertainment. She is listed in the reference book 80 Black women in Horror (Sumiko Saulson, 2017) and her stories have been included in several anthologies, including Black Magic Women Anthology, which features stories by some writers listed in 80 Black Women in Horror. Her contest-winning story, Guardians, featured in the Nosetouch Asterisk Anthology, Vol 2, (2018) is arguably the first African Cosmic Horror story published. Her works have also featured in academic studies, including the "Routledge Handbook of African Literature". She has also featured on multiple media platforms, discussing her unique writing and African Horror as a genre. She has written several blogs for Female First Magazine. Onoh has been mentioned as one of the new British horror writers bringing a positive change to how black and minority races are portrayed in mainstream horror fiction.

Onoh has also given talks and lectures, including at the prestigious Miskatonic Institute of Horror Studies.

Onoh writes about ghosts, vengeful African ghosts with unfinished business, and has been hailed as the "Queen of African Horror". Her writings have been described as works of "magical realism and horror", exploring the "philosophical positions that define the reality of Africa and Africans in a world that is bent towards Western globalization and the annihilation of African roots in culture." Her writing showcases both the beautiful and horrific in the African, mainly, Igbo culture and doesn't shy away from tackling issues of religious hypocrisy, child abuse, ritual killings, dangerous superstitions, corrupt politicians, evil witchdoctors and the plight of widows in the broader African culture, all within a fictitious horror context. Her book The Sleepless, a ghost story tackling both the ritual abuse of children and the horrors of the Biafran War, has been described as "a genuine powerhouse of horror storytelling" and as a work that "Goes beyond magical realism": "What distinguishes her genre as 'African Horror' is the detailed exploration of African beliefs on the mysterious and the spiritual, which reveals a lot about the 'African Self'".

Family
Onoh has two children, Candice Onyeama (writer and film director) and Jija Orka-Gyoh (student).

References

1962 births
British horror writers
Writers from Enugu
Living people
Nigerian emigrants to the United Kingdom
21st-century British novelists
21st-century British women writers
Nigerian refugees
Child refugees
Refugees in the United Kingdom
People of the Nigerian Civil War
People educated at The Mount School, York
Alumni of the University of Warwick
Black British women writers